Elachista festucicolella is a moth of the family Elachistidae. It is found from Sweden to the Alps and from Switzerland to Ukraine and Bulgaria.

Adults are on wing from late May to early July.

The larvae feed on Festuca ovina and Festuca rupicola. They mine the leaves of their host plant.

References

festucicolella
Moths described in 1853
Moths of Europe